"Wrapped Around" is a song co-written and recorded by American country music artist Brad Paisley.  It was released in August 2001 as the second single released from Paisley's album Part II and reached a peak of number 2 on the Billboard Hot Country Singles & Tracks chart in February 2002. It also peaked at number 35 on the Hot 100, making it a minor crossover hit.  Paisley wrote this song with Kelley Lovelace and Chris DuBois.

Content
The narrator talks about how his significant other is all he ever thinks about and consumes his life. He then discusses how she has had him "wrapped around her finger" ever since they first started dating. He also discusses how he thinks it is time to get married despite being together for only seven months.

Critical reception
Chuck Taylor, of Billboard magazine reviewed the song favorably saying that the song has "a personality-packed vocal performance, an infectious uptempo melody marked by an insinuating guitar riff, and a happy-to-be-in-love lyric." Taylor also calls it a "perky anthem" and says that Rogers' production "exemplifies all that is good about both contemporary and traditional country music."

Music video
The music video was directed by Brad Paisley and Jim Shea and was filmed on June 2, 2001. It begins with two children who say they are in love. Paisley says that "it's only been seven months" and the boy states "but that's long enough!" It also features Paisley in concert and around the theme park, Dollywood.

Personnel
Eddie Bayers - drums
Glen Duncan - fiddle
Kevin "Swine" Grantt - bass guitar
Bernie Herms - piano
Wes Hightower - background vocals
Gary Hooker - acoustic guitar
Mike Johnson - steel guitar
Mitch McMitchen - percussion
Brad Paisley - lead vocals, electric guitar, acoustic guitar, 6 string tic tac

Chart performance
"Wrapped Around" debuted at number 49 on the U.S. Billboard Hot Country Singles & Tracks for the week of September 1, 2001.

Year-end charts

References

2001 singles
Brad Paisley songs
Songs written by Brad Paisley
Song recordings produced by Frank Rogers (record producer)
Songs written by Chris DuBois
Songs written by Kelley Lovelace
Arista Nashville singles
2001 songs